Marcerra United Football Club is a semi-professional football club based in Kuala Lumpur. The club last competed in the Malaysia FAM League, the third tier of the Malaysian football league, in 2018.

The team also competes in the Kuala Lumpur League, a state league.

In 2018, the management of Marcerra United also has taken over the management of Malaysia Premier League club Kuantan FA, and renaming the club to Marcerra Kuantan FA.

As a result of financial problems, Marcerra United pulled out of the 2018 Malaysia FAM Cup league on 20 July 2018, with the team's result expunged from the league. This means they shared the same fate of their other club, Marcerra Kuantan, who pulled out of 2018 Malaysia Premier League with the same financial issue.

Club officials

Coaching and technical staff

Current squad
As of 7 March 2018

References

External links
 Official Website

Malaysia FAM League clubs
Football clubs in Malaysia
2012 establishments in Malaysia
Sport in Kuala Lumpur